Forest Live (formerly Forest Tour) is an annual British music festival featuring predominantly pop and rock bands and artist. The series of concerts are organised by the Forestry Commission, a British non-ministerial government department. The events are hosted in seven forest venues throughout the United Kingdom. The tour began in 2000, as part of an initiative to bring new audiences into forests, and encourage people to see their woodlands.

History

2001
 Levellers
 Jools Holland

2002
 Pulp
 Jools Holland

2003
 Status Quo
 Jools Holland
 The Beach Boys
 Courtney Pine
Motörhead

2004
 Paul Weller
 Bryan Ferry
 Jools Holland
 Sugababes
 Fun Lovin' Criminals 
 Status Quo

2005
 Madness
 The Beautiful South
 Ian Brown
 Daniel Bedingfield
 Jools Holland

2006
 UB40
 Embrace
 Massive Attack
 Jamie Cullum
 Van Morrison
 Pet Shop Boys
KT Tunstall
The Coral

2007
 James Morrison
 Travis
 The Feeling
 Blondie
 Van Morrison
 The Charlatans
 Jools Holland
M People

2008
 The Zutons
 Crowded House
 Elbow
 KT Tunstall
 McFly
 Status Quo
 The Charlatans
 Katherine Jenkins
 Jools Holland

2009
 Paul Weller
 Doves
 Simply Red
 James Morrison
 McFly
 Sugababes
 David Gray
 The Human League
 Vanessa-Mae
Status Quo
Jools Holland

2010
 Simply Red
 Keane
 Doves
 Scouting for Girls
 JLS
 Blondie
 Status Quo
 James Morrison
 Katie Melua
 The Saturdays

2011
 Erasure
 Simple Minds
 Bryan Ferry
 Texas
 The Script
 Scouting for Girls
 Status Quo
 The Courteeners
 Westlife

2012
 Plan B
 Will Young
 Ed Sheeran
 Madness
 Alfie Boe
 The Darkness
 Steps
 The Wanted
 The Wombats
 Razorlight

2013
 Paloma Faith
 Blondie
 Paul Weller
 The Script
 Olly Murs
 Jessie J
 The Charlatans
 James
 Jools Holland's Rhythm and Blues Orchestra
 Elvis Costello

2014 
 Paul Weller
 Jessie J
 Boyzone
 Suede
 Rebecca Ferguson
 James Blunt
 Katherine Jenkins
 Deacon Blue
 Little Mix
 The Pogues

2015
 Paloma Faith
 Tom Odell
 The Vamps
 Paul Heaton and Jacqui Abbott
 Sam Smith
 The Script
 Robert Plant and the Sensational Space Shifters
 Spandau Ballet
 McBusted
 James

2016 
 Rudimental
 Kaiser Chiefs
 UB40
 Tom Jones
 Guy Garvey
 John Newman
 Jake Bugg
 Paul Heaton and Jacqui Abbott
 Simply Red
 James Bay

2017 
 Rick Astley
 Craig David
 Elbow
 Olly Murs
 Tom Jones
 Clean Bandit

2018 
 Gary Barlow
 George Ezra
 Paul Heaton and Jacqui Abbott
 Kasabian
 Paloma Faith
 The Script
 UB40 with Ali, Astro & Mickey

2019 
 Foals
 Haçienda Classical
 Jack Savoretti
 Jess Glynne
 Paul Weller
 Stereophonics
 Tears For Fears

2020 
All of the 2020 concerts were cancelled due to the COVID-19 outbreak which hit the UK, but confirmed artists were.
 Rag'n'Bone Man
 Will Young
 James Morrison
 Madness
 Keane
 Noel Gallagher's High Flying Birds
 Kaiser Chiefs
 Jack Savoretti
 Madness
 Jools Holland & his Rhythm & Blues Orchestra

2021 
All of 2021 concerts were postponed until 2022 due to the COVID pandemic.

2022 
 Rag'n'Bone Man
 Madness (band)
 Keane (band)
 Noel Gallagher's High Flying Birds
 Texas (band)

References

External links 
Forest Live's website

Music festivals in England
Forests and woodlands of the United Kingdom
Forests and woodlands of England
Forestry agencies in the United Kingdom
Forestry in the United Kingdom
Recurring events established in 2000
Forestry events